Miktam or Michtam (Hebrew: מִכְתָּם) is a word of unknown meaning found in the headings of Psalms 16 and 56–60 in the Hebrew Bible. These six Psalms, and many others, are associated with King David, but this tradition is more likely to be sentimental than historical. They may have formed one of several smaller collections of psalms which preceded the present psalter and on which it was based.

Miktam corresponds to the Babylonian nakamu, lid, a metal cover for a vessel, but efforts to derive a meaning for the term in the Psalms have not been convincing.

In modern Hebrew, the word has come to mean "epigram", and numerous collections of Hebrew epigrams have used that word in their titles.

See also

References

External links
 A miktam of David
 Hebrew Word Study: Miktam

Hebrew words and phrases in the Hebrew Bible
Psalms